The 1925 Italian Grand Prix was a combined Grand Prix and Voiturette motor race held at Monza on 6 September 1925. The voiturettes competed for their own trophy.
It was the final race of the 1925 AIACR World Manufacturers' Championship season.

Classification 

* Voiturette

References

Italian Grand Prix
Italian Grand Prix
Grand Prix